United Nations Security Council resolution 1558, adopted unanimously on 17 August 2004, after recalling previous resolutions on the situation in Somalia, particularly resolutions 733 (1992) and 1519 (2003), the Council re-established a group to monitor the arms embargo against the country for a further six months.

The Security Council offered its support of the Somali reconciliation process, including the ongoing Somali National Reconciliation Conference. It condemned the illegal flow of weapons into and through Somalia in violation of the arms embargo, calling for improvements to be made to the monitoring of the embargo. Acting under Chapter VII of the United Nations Charter, the Council stressed that all countries should comply with the embargo. The Secretary-General Kofi Annan was asked to re-establish a monitoring group to monitor the implementation of the arms embargo against Somalia, update lists on those violating the sanctions, to co-operate with a Committee established in Resolution 751 (1992) and make recommendations.

See also
 Disarmament in Somalia
 List of United Nations Security Council Resolutions 1501 to 1600 (2003–2005)
 Somali Civil War

References

External links
 
Text of the Resolution at undocs.org

 1558
 1558
2004 in Somalia
August 2004 events